Macrobrachium carcinus is a species of fresh water shrimp known as the big claw river shrimp. It is native to streams, rivers and creeks from Florida to southern Brazil. It is an important species for commercial fishing in the Sao Francisco area, where it is known by the local name of pitu. M. carcinus is omnivorous, with a diet consisting of molluscs, small fish, algae, leaf litter and insects.

Macrobrachium carcinus has a tan or yellow body with dark brown stripes. Its chelae are unusually long and thin, to facilitate foraging for food in small crevices, and may be blue or green in colour.

References

Palaemonidae
Crustaceans described in 1758
Taxa named by Carl Linnaeus
Freshwater crustaceans of South America